GLX is a liquefied natural gas exchange in Singapore. The GLX platform, also known as the Global LNG Marketplace, allows members to post offers to sell or requests to buy cargoes, and then let other participants anonymously bid on proposals. The platform was launched in October 2016.

GLX Platform
GLX operates the platform in Singapore, with auctions being conducted based on either Singapore or London time. Parties initiating an auction set the commercial terms, including a reserve price, and select the counterparties they wish to invite into the auction. Successful auctions result in binding sales contracts.

Management
GLX was founded by Damien Criddle, who also serves as its Chief Executive Officer. The company is chaired by Rob Cole, a former executive director of Woodside Petroleum. Other executives include EVP - Business Development & Strategy Cameron Whitton and Director Dr Philip Home.

References

External links 
 

Liquefied natural gas
Stock exchanges in Singapore